Benarkabud-e Do (also Romanized as Benārkabūd-e Do, meaning "Benarkabud 2") is a village in Teshkan Rural District, Chegeni District, Dowreh County, Lorestan Province, Iran. At the 2006 census, its population was 263, in 56 families.

References 

Towns and villages in Dowreh County